Seroglazka is a rural locality (a selo) in Srednevolzhsky Selsoviet of Yenotayevsky District, Astrakhan Oblast, Russia. The population was 409 as of 2010. There are 7 streets.

Geography 
Seroglazka is located 56 km southeast of Yenotayevka (the district's administrative centre) by road. Promyslovy is the nearest rural locality.

References 

Rural localities in Yenotayevsky District